"Te llevaré al cielo" (English: I'll take you to Heaven) is the only single released from Maná's compilation album, Esenciales: Luna (2003). This single was released in promotion of their three CD set compilation albums: The Esenciales: Esenciales: Luna, Esenciales: Sol and Esenciales: Eclipse. This single top at number 7 on the Billboard Hot Latin Tracks and stayed for a total of 22 weeks.

References

2003 singles
Maná songs
Spanish-language songs
Songs written by Fher Olvera
Warner Music Latina singles
2003 songs